Piletocera albimixtalis is a moth in the family Crambidae. It was described by George Hampson in 1917. It is found in Australia, where it has been recorded from Queensland.

The wings have a pattern of various shades of brown.

References

albimixtalis
Moths described in 1917
Taxa named by George Hampson
Moths of Australia